Jeremy James Slechta (born May 12, 1980, in La Vista, Nebraska) is a former American football defensive lineman in the National Football League for the Philadelphia Eagles and Houston Texans.

Early life
He went to Papillion La Vista Senior High School in Papillion, Nebraska. He played college football at the University of Nebraska.

References

1980 births
Living people
People from Sarpy County, Nebraska
American football defensive tackles
Nebraska Cornhuskers football players
Philadelphia Eagles players
Houston Texans players